Ruin a Good Time is the second full-length studio album from New York City hardcore punk band, Awkward Thought. It was released in March 2003 on Thorp Records.

Track listing 
"Return the Compliment"  	– 2:37  	   
"Lack of Understanding" 	– 1:30 	
"Take Your Music and Shove It" 	– 1:09 	
"Required Contributions" 	– 2:52 	
"Lights Out" 	– 2:45 	
"Reliable Source" 	– 2:56 	
"Lead the Way" 	– 3:16 	
"Easy Way Out" 	– 5:12 	
"Other Side" 	– 1:59 	
"Tell Me" 	– 2:45 	
"Please Be Gone" 	– 2:43 	
"Way It Is" 	– 1:46 	
"Vice" 	– 2:20 	
"Swept Under the Rug" 	– 3:05

Credits 
 John Franko – vocals
 Dusty Blackwell – guitar
 Alex Walker – guitar
 Paul DeCourcey – bass
 Alex carpenter – drums
 Produced by Awkward Thought
 Cover art by Gary Gilmore

External links 
 Thorp Records band and album page

2003 albums
Awkward Thought albums